Brachydectes is an extinct genus of lysorophian amphibian that lived from the Carboniferous. It had a very small head (skull length about 1.7 cm) and an elongated body up to 43 cm long.

References

 Gaining Ground: The Origin and Early Evolution of Tetrapods by Jennifer A. Clack  
 Amniote Origins: Completing the Transition to Land by Stuart Sumida and Karen L.M Martin

Lysorophians
Carboniferous amphibians
Permian amphibians
Paleozoic amphibians of North America
Paleozoic amphibians of Europe
Prehistoric amphibian genera